Robert Thomson (1890–?) was a professional footballer, who played for Huddersfield Town.

References

1890 births
Year of death missing
Scottish footballers
Footballers from Glasgow
Association football defenders
English Football League players
Huddersfield Town A.F.C. players